The following is a partial list of First Nations band governments in Canada:

Alberta

Atlantic Canada

Newfoundland and Labrador
 Miawpukek First Nation
 Mushuau Innu First Nation
 Qalipu First Nation
 Sheshatshiu Innu First Nation

New Brunswick

Nova Scotia

Prince Edward Island
 Abegweit First Nation
 Lennox Island First Nation

British Columbia

Manitoba

Northern Canada

Northwest Territories

Nunavut

There are no First Nations band governments in Nunavut.

Yukon

Ontario

Quebec

Saskatchewan

See also
Americas
 Classification of indigenous peoples of the Americas
 Names of the indigenous territories of North America

Canada
List of Canadian Aboriginal leaders
 List of First Nations peoples
 List of Indian reserves in Canada
List of Indian reserves in Canada by population
List of place names in Canada of Aboriginal origin

United States
 Federally recognized tribes
 (Federally) unrecognized tribes
 Native Americans in the United States
 List of Alaska Native tribal entities
 List of Indian reservations in the United States
 List of historical Indian reservations in the United States
 National Park Service Native American Heritage Sites
 Outline of United States federal Indian law and policy
 State recognized tribes in the United States
:Category:Inuit groups

References

External links 
 The Canadian Museum of Civilization - First Peoples Section

 
First Nations
First Nations government